Jean-Lou Bigot (born 22 April 1966) is a French equestrian. He competed in two events at the 2000 Summer Olympics.

References

1966 births
Living people
French male equestrians
Olympic equestrians of France
Equestrians at the 2000 Summer Olympics
Sportspeople from Maine-et-Loire